"Gimme" is a song by Australian pop rock band Boom Crash Opera. The song was released in September 1994 as the lead single from their fourth  studio album, Born (1995), and reached number 14 on the Australian Singles Chart, becoming the band's fourth and final top-20 hit in Australia.

Track listing
Australian CD and cassette single
 "Gimme (Gimme Gimme Gimme Gimme What I Want)"
 "Come Inside My Mind"
 "Home Is Where the Head Is"
 "Gimme" (20% More mix)

Charts

References

External links
 Boom Crash Opera website

1994 songs
1994 singles
Ariola Records singles
Boom Crash Opera songs